Alan Alexander McNeill (born 16 August 1945) is a former professional footballer, who played for Crusaders, Middlesbrough, Huddersfield Town, Oldham Athletic, Stockport County, Witton Albion and Macclesfield Town.

Club career
McNeill attended Belfast High School and signed with Crusaders as a 15 year-old. He made an early impact with the Crues, helping them to some of their earliest trophy successes and played seven times in Amateur internationals. In October 1963 he scored the only goal against Glenavon in the Ulster Cup final replay. In 1967 he was amongst the scorers as the Crues handed out a surprise defeat to Glentoran in the Irish Cup Final. That summer he joined up with the Glens squad that travelled as the Detroit Cougars to compete in the USA Eastern Division.

In 1967 McNeill, who had previously been watched by Newcastle United and Leeds United, transferred to Middlesbrough shortly after returning from the US. He had to wait until mid-way through the 1967/68 season to make his Second Division debut, in a 1-0 win at Aston Villa. Despite his versatility - he could play either as a forward or as a defensive midfielder - McNeill played just four times for Boro. He did earn inclusion in the Northern Ireland Under-23 squad, coming off the bench in a 1-0 win over Wales at Swansea.

Early in the 1968/69 season McNeill was allowed to join Huddersfield Town, but it wasn't until he joined Oldham Athletic in October 1969 that he made a significant impact on League football. By then a strongly built and hard-working attacking midfielder, he made an immediate impact at Boundary Park. He helped the team turn around a nine game run without a win and in 1970/71 aided the Latics to promotion from the Fourth Division.

Injuries limited McNeill to just thirteen starts and five appearances from the bench during Oldham's 1973/74 Division Three championship campaign. He left Boundary Park in 1975 for Stockport County before drifting into non-league football two seasons later. He continued to pull on his boots in the Huddersfield League until the age of 46.

References

1945 births
Living people
Association footballers from Northern Ireland
Association footballers from Belfast
Association football defenders
English Football League players
Crusaders F.C. players
Middlesbrough F.C. players
Huddersfield Town A.F.C. players
Oldham Athletic A.F.C. players
Stockport County F.C. players
Witton Albion F.C. players